Minayev or Minaev is a Russian male surname, its feminine counterpart is Minayeva or Minaeva. It may refer to 
Aleksandr Minayev (disambiguation), several people
Dmitry Minayev (1835—1889), Russian poet, satirist, journalist, translator and literary critic
Ivan Minayev (1840–1890), the first Russian Indologist 
Yevgeny Minayev (1933–1993), Russian weightlifter
Irina Osipova (later Minayeva, born 1981), Russian basketball player